Jon Christopher Duplantier (born July 11, 1994) is an American professional baseball pitcher in the Philadelphia Phillies organization. The Arizona Diamondbacks selected Duplantier in the third round of the 2016 Major League Baseball draft. He has played in Major League Baseball (MLB) for the Diamondbacks, with whom he made his MLB debut in 2019.

Career

Amateur career
Duplantier attended Seven Lakes High School in Katy, Texas, and Rice University. He played college baseball for the Rice Owls. After missing the 2015 season due to a shoulder injury, Duplantier returned in 2016, and was named the Conference USA Pitcher of the Year.

Arizona Diamondbacks
The Arizona Diamondbacks selected Duplantier in the third round of the 2016 Major League Baseball draft. He made his professional debut with the Hillsboro Hops in June 2016, and pitched one inning there, striking out the side. He started 2017 with the Kane County Cougars and was later promoted to the Visalia Rawhide, posting a combined 12–3 record with a 1.39 ERA in 25 games, including 24 starts between both teams. He played in the 2017 All-Star Futures Game. MLB Pipeline named him their Pipeline Pitcher of the Year.

Duplantier spent the 2018 season pitching for the Jackson Generals. In 14 starts, he went 5–1 with a 2.55 ERA.

On April 1, 2019, Duplantier was called up to the major leagues for the first time, and made his major league debut. He recorded three scoreless innings in relief and earned a save. He finished the season with a 1–1 record in 15 games (three starts). Duplantier did not appear in a game with Arizona in 2020 and did not play in a minor league game due to the cancellation of the minor league season because of the COVID-19 pandemic.

Duplantier was assigned to the Triple-A Reno Aces to begin the 2021 season. He struggled to a 7.78 ERA in four games between Reno and the rookie-level Arizona League Diamondbacks, and fared worse in the majors, struggling to a 13.15 ERA with 12 strikeouts in 13 innings over four appearances. While pitching in the minor leagues, Duplantier suffered a season-ending lat strain. Since injured players cannot be placed on outright waivers, the Diamondbacks released Duplantier on July 27, 2021.
On July 31, the Diamondbacks re-signed Duplantier to a minor league contract. He elected minor league free agency following the season.

Los Angeles Dodgers
On December 4, 2021, the San Francisco Giants signed Duplianter to minor league contract. On December 8, the Los Angeles Dodgers selected Duplantier from the Giants in the minor league phase of the Rule 5 draft. He appeared in 34 games (14 starts) for the Triple-A Oklahoma City Dodgers during the 2022 season, with a 5–3 record and 4.80 ERA. He elected free agency on November 10, 2022.

Philadelphia Phillies
On January 6, 2023, Duplantier signed a minor league contract with the Philadelphia Phillies organization.

See also
Rule 5 draft results

References

External links

Jon Duplantier Rice Owls bio

1994 births
Living people
People from Newark, Delaware
Baseball players from Delaware
Major League Baseball pitchers
African-American baseball players
Arizona Diamondbacks players
Rice Owls baseball players
Hillsboro Hops players
Kane County Cougars players
Visalia Rawhide players
Jackson Generals (Southern League) players
Reno Aces players
Salt River Rafters players
21st-century African-American sportspeople
Oklahoma City Dodgers players